Talur may refer to:
 Talur, Golestan (تلور)
 Talur, Ilam (طلور)